Crayne is a census-designated place  and unincorporated community within Crittenden County, Kentucky, United States. As of the 2010 census it had a population of 173.

Geography
Crayne is located in southern Crittenden County along U.S. Route 641, which leads north  to Marion, the county seat, and south  to Fredonia.

Demographics

References

Census-designated places in Crittenden County, Kentucky
Unincorporated communities in Kentucky
Census-designated places in Kentucky